William Williams was an English footballer. His regular position was as a forward. He played for Everton, Blackburn Rovers, Bristol City, and Manchester United.

External links
MUFCInfo.com profile

Year of birth missing
Year of death missing
English footballers
Manchester United F.C. players
Everton F.C. players
Blackburn Rovers F.C. players
Bristol City F.C. players
Association football forwards